Lilja is a Swedish and Finnish surname, meaning lily in both Swedish,  Icelandic and Finnish.

Geographical distribution
As of 2014, 58.1% of all known bearers of the surname Lilja were residents of Sweden (frequency 1:1,643), 22.9% of Finland (1:2,324), 11.5% of the United States (1:305,627), 3.0% of Denmark (1:18,091) and 1.0% of Norway (1:51,943).

In Sweden, the frequency of the surname was higher than national average (1:1,643) in the following counties:
 1. Blekinge County (1:733)
 2. Jönköping County (1:1,003)
 3. Östergötland County (1:1,006)
 4. Örebro County (1:1,308)
 5. Skåne County (1:1,315)
 6. Västmanland County (1:1,337)
 7. Kalmar County (1:1,351)
 8. Kronoberg County (1:1,357)
 9. Gotland County (1:1,426)

In Finland, the frequency of the surname was higher than national average (1:2,324) in the following regions:
 1. Satakunta (1:1,051)
 2. Tavastia Proper (1:1,238)
 3. Päijänne Tavastia (1:1,402)
 4. Lapland (1:1,635)
 5. Uusimaa (1:1,772)

People
 Ann-Charlotte Lilja (born 1946), Swedish swimmer
 Lars Lilja (born 1954), Swedish social democratic politician
 Efva Lilja (born 1956), Swedish artist and professor of choreography
 Karl-Erik Lilja (born 1957), retired Swedish ice hockey player
 George Lilja (born 1958), American football offensive lineman
 James Lilja (born 1966), American gynecologic oncologist and musician
 Arto Lilja (born 1973), Finnish ski-orienteering competitor
 Max Lilja (born 1975), Finnish cello player
 Niklas Lilja, race driver and factory test driver
 Arto Lilja (born 1973), Finnish ski-orienteering competitor
 Andreas Lilja (born 1975), Swedish professional ice hockey defenceman
 Ryan Lilja (born 1981), American football center and guard
 Jakob Lilja (born 1993), Swedish ice hockey player
 Kim Lilja (born 1994), Swedish ice hockey player

References

Swedish-language surnames
Finnish-language surnames